"The Ghosts of Beverly Drive" is a song by American indie rock band Death Cab for Cutie. It is the second single from their eighth studio album Kintsugi.

Background
"The Ghosts of Beverly Drive" deals with the specters remaining from Gibbard's ill-fated stint living in Los Angeles between 2009 and 2011, and more directly, his marriage and divorce from actress Zooey Deschanel. In the song's chorus, Gibbard finds himself "return[ing] to the scene of these crimes, where the hedgerows slowly wind."

Music video
The song's music video was directed by Robert Hales. In the in black and white shot clip, the members of the band play employees of a celebrity tour bus company in Los Angeles, cruising tourists around the city's ritziest neighborhoods in search of stars. Hales took several star tours as research for the role, and based several moments, such as the scene in which the band are sprayed with a hose, from real moments. James Montgomery at Rolling Stone wrote that the video "explore[s] the sense of separation that's so prevalent in a city like Los Angeles, where societal divides are often as apparent as the ivy-covered walls surrounding a Bel-Air mansion."

Release
The band debuted the song in live performances leading up to release of Kintsugi. Its studio version premiered on March 9, 2015. The band promoted the song and album with a performance on the late-night program Conan.

Evan Sawdey at PopMatters praised its energy, while Colin Stutz at Billboard called the song "a moving number from the band that’s no stranger to literary lyrics, as frontman Ben Gibbard leads listeners along a winding metaphor propped up by lush production."

Charts

Weekly charts

Year-end charts

References

External links
 .

2015 singles
2015 songs
Death Cab for Cutie songs
Atlantic Records singles
Songs written by Ben Gibbard
Music videos directed by Robert Hales